Abd ol Mowmen (also Romanized as ‘Abd ol Mow’men; also known as ‘Abdol Fūman, ‘Abd ol Mo’men, Abdul Momin, and Bounna) is a village in Shirin Su Rural District, Shirin Su District, Kabudarahang County, Hamadan Province, Iran. At the 2006 census, its population was 1,008, in 215 families.

References 

Populated places in Kabudarahang County